Burleigh House is a historic building in the City of Westminster, London, United Kingdom. It is located at 355 on The Strand. It was built in the 18th century. It has been Grade II listed since May 1, 1986.

References

Grade II listed buildings in the City of Westminster
Buildings and structures completed in the 18th century